Ernie Tapai (born 14 February 1967) is an Australian former professional soccer player who spent the majority of his career in the Australian National Soccer League (NSL). He also had stints in England, Portugal and Singapore. Tapai played 52 times for Australia, including 37 times in full international matches.

Early life
Tapai was born in Subotica, Yugoslavia (now in Serbia). He migrated to Australia with his parents as a young child.

Club career
After playing as a junior for Melbourne Hungaria, Tapai signed for Footscray JUST ahead of the 1985 National Soccer League season. He made at age 18 in the National Soccer League. After playing with Sunshine George Cross and Adelaide City Tapai moved to Europe to play for English side Stoke City.Stoke City. He never got much of a chance at Stoke making just once appearance for the club which came as a substitute in a 2–2 draw with Crewe Alexandra in the Football League Trophy on 6 January 1993.

Tapai then signed with Portuguese club Estoril, participating in the 1993–94 Primeira Divisão season, where he scored his only goal against Benfica, but moved back to play in Australia. He went on to play for Gippsland Falcons and Perth Glory before playing for three years in Singapore with Home United and Clementi Khalsa and retired after the 2002 season with Westgate.

After ending his playing career Tapai went into coaching.

International career
Tapai played 52 games (37 'A' games) for the Australia national team between 1986 and 1998. He was part of the Australia squad that claimed 2nd place at the 1997 FIFA Confederations Cup. Australian manager Terry Venables received criticism for bringing on Tapai in the 1997 World Cup Qualifier against Iran. Australia needed a goal and Tapai was not the man many viewed as being a viable attacking option.

Career statistics

Club

International

Scores and results list Australia's goal tally first, score column indicates score after each Tapai goal.

References

1967 births
Living people
Australian soccer players
Australian expatriate soccer players
Australia international soccer players
Adelaide City FC players
Footscray JUST players
Perth Glory FC players
Stoke City F.C. players
Caroline Springs George Cross FC players
National Soccer League (Australia) players
Australian people of Hungarian descent
Home United FC players
Balestier Khalsa FC players
Singapore Premier League players
Collingwood Warriors S.C. players
G.D. Estoril Praia players
Primeira Liga players
Association football midfielders
Gippsland Falcons players
1996 OFC Nations Cup players
1997 FIFA Confederations Cup players
1998 OFC Nations Cup players
Expatriate footballers in England
Expatriate footballers in Portugal
Expatriate footballers in Singapore
Australian expatriate sportspeople in England
Australian expatriate sportspeople in Portugal
Australian expatriate sportspeople in Singapore